The 2007 CCHA Men's Ice Hockey Tournament was the 36th CCHA Men's Ice Hockey Tournament. It was played between March 2 and March 17, 2007. Opening round and quarterfinal games were played at campus sites, while the semifinals, third place, and championship games were played at Joe Louis Arena in Detroit, Michigan. By winning the tournament, Notre Dame won the Mason Cup and received the Central Collegiate Hockey Association's automatic bid to the 2007 NCAA Division I Men's Ice Hockey Tournament.

Conference standings
Note: GP = Games played; W = Wins; L = Losses; T = Ties; PTS = Points; GF = Goals For; GA = Goals Against

Bracket

Note: * denotes overtime period(s)

First round

(5) Nebraska-Omaha vs. (12) Bowling Green

(6) Western Michigan vs. (11) Alaska

(7) Ohio State vs. (10) Northern Michigan

(8) Lake Superior State vs. (9) Ferris State

Quarterfinals

(1) Notre Dame vs. (11) Alaska

(2) Michigan vs. (10) Northern Michigan

(3) Miami vs. (8) Lake Superior State

(4) Michigan State vs. (5) Nebraska-Omaha

Semifinals

(1) Notre Dame vs. (8) Lake Superior State

(2) Michigan vs. (4) Michigan State

Third place

(4) Michigan State vs. (8) Lake Superior State

Championship

(1) Notre Dame vs. (2) Michigan

Tournament awards

All-Tournament Team
F Kevin Porter (Michigan)
F T. J. Hensick (Michigan)
F Erik Condra (Notre Dame)
D Wes O'Neill (Notre Dame)
D Jack Johnson (Michigan)
G David Brown* (Notre Dame)
* Most Valuable Player(s)

References

External links
2007 CCHA Men's Ice Hockey Tournament

CCHA Men's Ice Hockey Tournament
Ccha tournament